London Live is a local television channel in London, England. The channel airs local news, current affairs, sports, arts, events, and entertainment. It is part of the nationwide rollout of local television channels by Ofcom, the UK office of communications. The owner of London Live is Russian oligarch Evgeny Lebedev, who is also the chairman and owner of both Evening Standard Ltd (publisher of the Evening Standard newspaper, which he bought in January 2009) and Independent Print Ltd (publisher of The Independent and Independent on Sunday, which he bought in March 2010).

History

London Live launched at 18:30 on 31 March 2014.

The channel is owned by ESTV, which won the Local Digital Television Programme Service (L-DTPS) auction from Ofcom in February 2013. ESTV is owned by Lebedev Holdings.

The channel broadcasts on the CoMux-operated London local DTT Multiplexing (mux), transmitted on UHF channel 29 from the Crystal Palace transmitting station, and is also available via satellite and cable TV to viewers with London postcodes. On 21 March 2018, the London DTT mux was moved to UHF channel 35 as part of 700 MHz clearance plans. Crystal Palace also operates on a single frequency network with Croydon, which improves reception in South and East London. London Live also now occupies the unadvertised local mux available on UHF channel 34 from the Hemel Hempstead relay as of 27 March 2019, which has extended coverage outside the M25 to Hemel Hempstead and St. Albans areas.

Test broadcasts for London Live began at the start of March 2014 with the broadcast of a short looped promotional film featuring clips from the channel’s programming.

London Live broadcasts from studios at Northcliffe House in Kensington, which is also the headquarters of The Independent and London Evening Standard newspapers, both owned by Lebedev Holdings. Before the launch, the channel was expected to spend between £15m and £18m before breaking even in about three years. Revenue was predicted to hit the £25m mark by then.

Programmes

Original programmes

Since the channel first launched, London Live has commissioned a varied portfolio of programs, including Drag Queens of London, Good Morning Breakfast, CTRL Freaks, Can You Cook It, Food Junkies, Fresh Fantasy, Jeff Leach +1, Place Invaders,  F2 Kicks Off and Nihal's City Swagger. It has also commissioned documentaries including Girl on Girl, Jail Birds, Half Man Standing, Teenage Kicks, Sizzle London, The Young Upstarts, Digital Nation, Roger & Robin's Night Club Tips, Ron & Ron, Fight Club London, No Place Like Home, Antisocial Network, and Beggar Off.

In September 2013 the channel announced its first acquired series with the family sitcom, All About the McKenzies. The show, previously only available via YouTube, is written and produced by Samuell Benta.

On 27 November 2013, London Live announced its first prime-time commission F2 Kicks Off from UK indie Renowned Films, hosted by the F2Freestylers duo Billy Wingrove and Jeremy Lynch.

In January 2014 the channel announced acquired the web show Brothers With No Game. In March 2014, Drag Queens of London was announced.

Other programmes
London Live also broadcasts a range of comedy, drama, documentaries and entertainment programmes such as London Real, Absolute Power, Green Wing, Peep Show, Smack the Pony, Spaced, Trigger Happy TV, Twenty Twelve, Famous, Rich and Homeless, Filthy Rich and Homeless, Soho Blues, The Tube, Snog Marry Avoid?, Vice Squad, Hale and Pace, Born Equal, Freefall, Harley Street, London's Burning, Misfits, Moses Jones, The Shadow Line, White Teeth, 10 Years Younger, and Cash in the Attic. By 2021, the channel was showing a range of classic shows (similar to programmes already repeated on Talking Pictures TV, ITV4 or Forces TV) alongside films and local programmes with titles including Sapphire and Steel, Danger Man, and Goodnight Sweetheart in the schedules.

In July 2017, it was announced the channel would have an early morning lineup of children's programming from the libraries of Saban Brands and Studio 100 (such as Mighty Morphin Power Rangers (1993–96, 2010 “Disney era” version) and Digimon). As of 2022, children's programming is currently sourced from 41 Entertainment, from the Ex-BKN International library.

Former on-air team 

 Anthony Baxter (Presenter/Head of News)
 Alex Beard (Presenter)
 Alison Earle (Presenter/Reporter)
 Marc Edwards (Presenter/Reporter)
 Louise Scodie (Presenter/Reporter)
 Claudia Liza Vanderpuije (née Armah) (Presenter/Reporter)
 Gavin Ramjaun (Presenter/Reporter)
 Luke Blackall (Presenter/Reporter)
 Reya El-Salahi (Presenter/Reporter)
 Stefan Levy (Presenter/Reporter)
 Simon Thompson (Entertainment Producer/Editor)
 Toby Earle (TV Editor)

David Icke interview 
In April 2020, the UK’s culture secretary Oliver Dowden called on the media regulator Ofcom to take action against London Live after it broadcast a 105-minute interview with the conspiracy theorist David Icke which contained allegations about the source of the COVID-19 pandemic. The interview was an edited version of an interview Icke recorded with the YouTube channel London Real in March. YouTube deleted a later London Live interview with Icke and said it would wipe any other videos that falsely linked COVID-19 to 5G mobile networks. 

Ofcom later confirmed that the 80-minute interview broke broadcasting rules, stating that Icke “expressed views which had the potential to cause significant harm to viewers in London during the pandemic” and his “claims went largely unchallenged” being “made without the support of any scientific or other evidence”.

Awards and nominations

References

External links 
 

Local television channels in the United Kingdom
Television in London
Television channels and stations established in 2014
2014 establishments in England
London Evening Standard